Jamshlu or Jamushvan is a village in the Alagyaz Municipality of the Aragatsotn Province of Armenia. The town is mostly populated by Kurds.

References

External links 

Report of the results of the 2001 Armenian Census

Populated places in Aragatsotn Province
Kurdish settlements in Armenia
Yazidi populated places in Armenia